In Memoriam: Hungarian Composers, Victims Of The Holocaust is a 2008 classical music album by pianist Márta Gulyás with Vilmos Szabadi (violin), Péter Bársony (viola), Ditta Rohmann (cello) and other artists from the Hungaroton stable.

Track listing
Pál Budai: "Doll Doctor: Short Dances" Márta Gulyás (piano), Emese Mali (piano)
Elemér Gyulai: "Lullaby" Bernadette Wiedemann (mezzo-soprano), Márta Gulyás
Air Márta Gulyás
György Justus: "Jazz Suite" Márta Gulyás
Sándor Kuti: "Serenade for string trio", Vilmos Szabadi (violin), Péter Bársony (viola), Ditta Rohmann (cello)
Sonata for Solo Violin Vilmos Szabadi (violin)
Sándor Vándor: "Air" Ditta Rohmann (cello piccolo), Márta Gulyás (piano)
László Weiner: "Duo for Violin and Viola" Vilmos Szabadi (violin), Péter Bársony (viola)

References

2008 classical albums
Works about the Holocaust